Abbey Is Blue is the fourth album by American jazz vocalist Abbey Lincoln featuring tracks recorded in 1959 for the Riverside label.

Reception

AllMusic awarded the album 4½ stars, with the review by Scott Yanow stating: "Abbey Lincoln is quite emotional and distinctive during a particularly strong set... very memorable". All About Jazz also gave the album 4½ stars, with David Rickert calling it "a breakthrough performance in jazz singing", and observing: "With the civil rights movement looming over the horizon, no longer did singers need to stick with standards and Tin Pan Alley tunes and could truly sing about subjects that mattered to them. Lincoln picked up Billie Holiday's skill at inhabiting the lyrics of a song and projecting its emotional content outward, and these songs, all of which deal with sorrow, are stark and harrowing accounts of loss and injustice."

Track listing
 "Afro Blue" (Mongo Santamaría) - 3:20     
 "Lonely House" (Langston Hughes, Kurt Weill) - 3:40     
 "Let Up" (Abbey Lincoln) - 5:32     
 "Thursday's Child" (Elisse Boyd, Murray Grand) - 3:31     
 "Brother, Where Are You?" (Oscar Brown) - 3:10     
 "Laugh, Clown, Laugh" (Ted Fio Rito, Sam M. Lewis, Joe Young) - 5:24     
 "Come Sunday" (Duke Ellington) - 5:13     
 "Softly, as in a Morning Sunrise" (Oscar Hammerstein II, Sigmund Romberg) - 2:46     
 "Lost in the Stars" (Maxwell Anderson, Kurt Weill) - 4:11     
 "Long as You're Living" (Oscar Brown, Julian Priester, Tommy Turrentine) - 2:33

Personnel 
Abbey Lincoln - vocals
Kenny Dorham (tracks 2, 4, 7-9), Tommy Turrentine (tracks 1, 3, 6, 10)  - trumpet
Julian Priester - trombone (tracks 1, 3, 6, 10)
Stanley Turrentine - tenor saxophone (tracks 1, 3, 6, 10)
Les Spann - guitar (tracks 2, 4, 7-9), flute (track 5) 
Wynton Kelly (tracks 2, 4, 5), Cedar Walton (tracks 3, 6), Phil Wright (tracks 7-9) - piano
Bobby Boswell (tracks 1, 3, 6, 10), Sam Jones (tracks 2, 4, 5, 7-9) - bass
Philly Joe Jones (tracks: 2, 4, 5, 7-9), Max Roach (tracks: 1, 3, 6, 10) - drums

References 

1959 albums
Abbey Lincoln albums
Albums produced by Orrin Keepnews
Riverside Records albums